Astana Opera is an opera house in Astana, Kazakhstan, on the basis of an executive order of Nursultan Nazarbayev.

History of design and construction 
The design has been partially made by Nursultan Nazarbayev, and the construction began on 6 July 2010 under direction of Mabetex Group. The Opera House sits on a 9 ha site.
The opera house opened in 2013, the inaugurative representation being the Kazakh opera Birzhan and Sara.
The acoustics of the theatre is considered one of the best in the world and it was designed by the Italian Enrico Moretti  (Biobyte ) and Maria Cairoli.

Description 
The opera house includes two halls:
 the Main Hall (1250 seats), which hosts opera and ballet performances, and has an orchestra pit with room for up to 120 musicians,
 the Chamber Hall (250 seats), for chamber music concerts.

It is the second newly built opera house in Astana, as the Palace of Peace and Reconciliation, hosting a 1500 seats opera hall, was completed in 2006. It is considered the third biggest opera house in the world; one of its remarkable characteristics is the 1.6 ton chandelier hanging in the 13 m high concourse. The opera house has also several facilities, such as a restaurant and all installations required for the troupe's rehearsals. The style of the opera house is inspired by the Italian theaters of the 19th century, but also include typical elements of the national heritage, such as frescos of Sharyn Canyon and Burabay.

Troupe and repertoire 
The opera house hosts its own orchestra and ballet and opera troupe, playing mostly classical opera; their repertoire includes majors classical pieces, such as the opera La traviata or Tosca and the ballet The Nutcracker, but also national pieces, such as the operas Abai and Birzhan and Sara. The orchestra is 90% young musicians. The troupe was on tour in 2014, performing in New York City, Toronto and Paris.

Related videos 
Here are some videos recorded inside the opera house or in the nearby area:
 Astana Opera House
 Sara Birzhan performance
 Ballet performance in Astana Opera House
 Celebration of victory day in front of Astana Opera House

See also

 Aidar Abzhakhanov, conductor at Astana Opera

References 

Opera houses in Kazakhstan
Buildings and structures in Astana
Buildings and structures completed in 2013
2013 establishments in Kazakhstan